Domício da Gama (October 23, 1862 – November 8, 1925) was a Brazilian journalist, diplomat and writer. He was Brazil's ambassador to the United States from 1911 to 1918. In 1918 he became Brazil's minister of Foreign Affairs. From 1919 to 1924, he served as Brazil's ambassador to the United Kingdom.

Early life
De Gama was born on October 23, 1862 in Maricá, Rio de Janeiro, Empire of Brazil. He attended preparatory school in Rio de Janeiro and before entering the Polytechnic School, but did not finish.

Career
He entered the Brazilian foreign diplomatic service; his first commission was the secretary of the Immigration Service, and the contact at that time, the Baron of Rio Branco made him Secretary of the Rio Branco mission which established the boundaries of Brazil and Argentina and the boundary with French Guiana and the British Guyana.

He was Secretary of Legation at the Holy See in 1900 and minister in Lima in 1906, where he instrumental in preparing for the policy of Rio Branco crowned by the Treaty of Petropolis. In 1910, he was Ambassador on special mission representing Brazil in Argentina's independence centenary and the centennial celebrations of Chile.

From 1911 to 1918, he served as Brazil's ambassador to the United States, before becoming Brazil's minister for Foreign Affairs in 1918. After one year however, he was sent to London to be the Ambassador to Great Britain.

Honors and awards
On March 4, 1915 Gama and two others received the Thanks of Congress and were awarded Congressional Gold Medals (P.L. 63-75, 38 Stat. 1228). The statute reads as follows.
 
Resolved by the Senate and House of Representatives of the United States of America in Congress assembled, That the thanks of Congress to their excellencies be, and they are hereby, presented to their excellencies Señor Domício da Gama, Señor Rómulo S. Naón, and Señor Eduardo Suárez for their generous services as mediators in the controversy between the Government of the United States of America and the leaders of the warring parties in the Republic of Mexico. That the President of the United States is hereby authorized and requested to cause to be made and presented to their excellencies Señor Domicio da Gama, Señor Rómulo S. Naón, and Señor Eduardo Suárez suitable gold medals, appropriately inscribed, which shall express the high estimation in which Congress holds the services of these distinguished statesmen, and the Republics which they represent, in the promotion of peace and order in the American continent.

Personal life
On November 27, 1912, De Gama was married to American heiress Elizabeth (née Bates) Volck Hearn at 856 Fifth Avenue in New York City (the home of U.S. Steel President Elbert Henry Gary) by Mayor William Jay Gaynor. Elizabeth, the widow of Arthur H. Hearn, was a daughter of Joseph Bates and Amanda Jane (née Bell) Bates.

De Gama died on November 8, 1925 in Rio de Janeiro, Brazil.

Gallery

See also
Brazil – United States relations

References

External links

 
 

1862 births
1925 deaths
Ambassadors of Brazil to the United States
Ambassadors of Brazil to the United Kingdom
Congressional Gold Medal recipients
Brazilian journalists
People from Maricá